Gairlochy was a railway station in western Scotland. It was the first station on the Highland Railway's branch to Fort Augustus (originally the Invergarry and Fort Augustus Railway). It opened in 1903 and was closed in 1947.

History
The station opened on 22 July 1903. The Highland Railway company appointed Donald Macdonald as station master in 1903. The station was operated by the Highland Railway from 1903 to 1907, and then by the North British Railway until 1922. From 1923 it was operated by the London and North Eastern Railway.

References

External links
 Gairlochy station on navigable O. S. map

Disused railway stations in Highland (council area)
Former North British Railway stations
Railway stations in Great Britain opened in 1903
Railway stations in Great Britain closed in 1911
Railway stations in Great Britain opened in 1913
Railway stations in Great Britain closed in 1933